Guadalcacín may refer to:
 Guadalcacín River or Majaceite, the main tributary of the river Guadalete in Andalusia, Spain
 Embalse de Guadalcacín, a reservoir in the province of Cádiz, Andalusia, Spain
 Guadalcacín (Jerez de la Frontera), a district in Jerez de la Frontera, Spain